Folkebladet was a Norwegian American newspaper published in Minneapolis, Minnesota at Augsburg Seminary (now Augsburg University) from 1877 to 1952. Georg Sverdrup was the paper's creator and first editor. It identified itself as the "organ of the Lutheran Free Church" and focused on church activities in Minnesota, Iowa, North Dakota, South Dakota, Wisconsin, and other states.

Folkebladet is available online through a digitization effort supported by Lindell Library at Augsburg University.

References

History of Minneapolis
Newspapers published in Minnesota
Newspapers established in 1877
Mass media in Minneapolis–Saint Paul
Scandinavian history
Norwegian migration to North America
Norwegian-American culture in Minneapolis–Saint Paul
Norwegian-language newspapers
Defunct newspapers published in Minnesota
1877 establishments in Minnesota